Aquamole Pot is a limestone cave in West Kingsdale, North Yorkshire, England. It was originally discovered by cave divers who negotiated  of sump passage from Rowten Pot in 1974, to enter a high aven above the river passage. All subsequent major explorations were undertaken from below before an entrance was opened up from the surface.

Description

This enters a chamber, and a crawl continues which soon descends into a continuation of the stream passage. At the base of the shaft, downstream quickly leads to a large sump pool, and upstream terminates where a small stream descends from an aven. From the downstream sump a  dive leads into Frake's Passage in Rowten Pot.

A passage above the sump pool has been climbed into a stream passage with water flowing from Green Laids Pot. Three successive avens have been climbed to a point where the way on is too small.

From the large ledge in Aquamole Aven, a small pitch upwards gains access to the One-armed Bandit Series. This starts as a large passage which traverses over a deep hole in the floor, before dividing. To the right a low wet crawl terminates just before the base of Jingling Pot. To the left, a series of large avens have been climbed almost to the surface.

A steeply descending rift then leads to an  pitch which drops into the sump pool chamber.

Geology and hydrology

Aquamole Pot is a karst cave formed within the Great Scar Limestone Group of the Visean Stage of the Carboniferous Period, laid down about 335 Ma. It is likely that water from the nearby Jingling Pot originally flowed through the One-armed Bandit Series, and was the major feeder of Aquamole Aven. This water has since been captured by Jingling Caves.

History

The bottom of the cave, Aquamole Aven was discovered by Geoff Yeadon and 'Bear' Statham in 1974 after diving the upstream sump at the bottom of Rowten Pot. A team returned in 1980, and they used bolting equipment to complete the climb. They then climbed up the rift at the top to reach the bottom of the  aven. Scaling poles were taken through the sumps by a large team, and its ascent was completed in two trips. The passage towards Jingling Pot was explored, and a series of avens climbed which reached near the surface. The upstream junction in the One-armed Bandit Series was radio-located and was found to be found to be  from  Jingling Pot.

This was finally connected to the surface in June 2002.

References

External links
Online surveys of Aquamole Pot
Rigging guide for Aquamole Pot

Caves of North Yorkshire